The annulated gecko (Gonatodes annularis) is a species of lizard in the Sphaerodactylidae family found in northern South America.

References

Gonatodes
Reptiles described in 1887